Evgeny Andreevich Grigorenko (Григоренко, Евгений Андреевич, born August 11, 1992) is a Russian professional ice hockey player. He is currently playing with Metallurg Novokuznetsk of the Supreme Hockey League (VHL).

Grigorenko made his Kontinental Hockey League (KHL) debut playing with Metallurg Magnitogorsk during the 2012–13 KHL season.

References

External links

1992 births
Living people
Admiral Vladivostok players
Ak Bars Kazan players
Metallurg Magnitogorsk players
Metallurg Novokuznetsk players
HC Neftekhimik Nizhnekamsk players
Russian ice hockey right wingers
People from Magnitogorsk
Sportspeople from Chelyabinsk Oblast